Elizabeth "Betsy" Dunn is an American politician who served in the Vermont House of Representatives from 2017 to 2019.

References

Living people
21st-century American politicians
21st-century American women politicians
Democratic Party members of the Vermont House of Representatives
Women state legislators in Vermont
People from Metuchen, New Jersey
Year of birth missing (living people)